Vrata is a village in Primorje-Gorski Kotar County, Croatia. The village is administered as a part of Fužine municipality.
According to national census of 2011, population of the village is 287.

Sources

Populated places in Primorje-Gorski Kotar County
Fužine, Croatia